Marathon is an unincorporated community in eastern Jackson Township, Clermont County, Ohio, United States.  Although it is unincorporated, it had a post office, with the ZIP code 45145.  The current ZIP code is 45118. It lies along U.S. Route 50.

History
Marathon was originally called Cynthiana, and under the latter name was laid out in 1838. A post office called Marathon was established in 1845, and remained in operation until it was discontinued in 2011.

Gallery

References

Unincorporated communities in Clermont County, Ohio
Unincorporated communities in Ohio